Proteles amplidentus is an extinct species of hyena closely related to the aardwolf. It lived during the  Plio-Pleistocene in South Africa, where fossils have been found in the Swartkrans dated to as recently as 1.5 million years ago.

Proteles amplidentus was similar to the modern aardwolf in most respects but had less reduced cheek teeth.

References

Pliocene mammals of Africa
Pleistocene mammals of Africa
Prehistoric hyenas